Brynamman East railway station served the village of Brynamman, in the historical county of Glamorganshire, Wales, from 1868 to 1964 on the Swansea Vale Railway.

History 
The station was opened as Brynamman on 2 March 1868 by the Swansea Vale Railway. Its name was changed to Brynamman East in 1950. It closed to passengers on 25 September 1950 and closed to goods on 28 September 1964.

References 

Disused railway stations in Carmarthenshire
Railway stations in Great Britain opened in 1868
Railway stations in Great Britain closed in 1950
1868 establishments in Wales
1964 disestablishments in Wales